Conny Samuelsson (born 15 August 1947) is a former international speedway rider from Sweden.

Speedway career 
Samuelsson won the silver medal at the Individual Ice Speedway World Championship in the 1977 Individual Ice Speedway World Championship. He had won a bronze medal the previous year in the 1976 Individual Ice Speedway World Championship.
.

He rode in the top tier of British Speedway in 1969 riding for Oxford Cheetahs. It was the only club outside of the Njudungarna team that he ever rode for. He spent 35 years riding for Njudungarna.

World final appearances

Ice World Championship
1975 –  Moscow, 3rd – 26pts
1976 –  Assen, 2nd – 26pts
1977 –  Inzell, 5th – 19pts
1978 –  Assen, 13th – 5pts

References 

1947 births
Living people
Swedish speedway riders
Oxford Cheetahs riders